Kampong Kulapis is a village in the west of Brunei-Muara District, Brunei, about  from the capital Bandar Seri Begawan. It is one of the villages within Mukim Sengkurong.The postcode is BG2521.

Geography 
The adjacent villages include Kampong Tanjong Nangka to the north, Kampong Mulaut to the north-east, Kampong Bebatik to the east and south-east, Kampong Batong to the south and south-west, and Kampong Katimahar to the west and north-west.

Facilities 
Pehin Khatib Abdullah Mosque is the village mosque; it was inaugurated in May 2017 by Sultan Hassanal Bolkiah and can accommodate 700 worshippers. The mosque is a waqf by an anonymous donor.

References

External links 
 Blog of Kampong Kulapis 

Kulapis